The memento pattern is a software design pattern that exposes the private internal state of an object.
One example of how this can be used is to restore an object to its previous state (undo via rollback), another is versioning, another is custom serialization.

The memento pattern is implemented with three objects: the originator, a caretaker and a memento. The originator is some object that has an internal state. The caretaker is going to do something to the originator, but wants to be able to undo the change. The caretaker first asks the originator for a memento object. Then it does whatever operation (or sequence of operations) it was going to do. To roll back to the state before the operations, it returns the memento object to the originator. The memento object itself is an opaque object (one which the caretaker cannot, or should not, change). When using this pattern, care should be taken if the originator may change other objects or resources—the memento pattern operates on a single object.

Classic examples of the memento pattern include a pseudorandom number generator (each consumer of the PRNG serves as a caretaker who can initialize the PRNG (the originator) with the same seed (the memento) to produce an identical sequence of pseudorandom numbers) and the state in a finite state machine.

Overview
The Memento design pattern is one of the twenty-three well-known GoF design patterns that describe how to solve recurring design problems to design flexible and reusable object-oriented software, that is, objects that are easier to implement, change, test, and reuse. The Memento Pattern was created by Noah Thompson, David Espiritu, and Dr. Drew Clinkenbeard for early HP products.

What problems can the Memento design pattern solve? 

 The internal state of an object should be saved externally so that the object can be restored to this state later.
 The object's encapsulation must not be violated.

The problem is that a well designed object is encapsulated so that its representation (data structure)  
is hidden inside the object and can't be accessed from outside the object.

What solution does the Memento design pattern describe? 
Make an object (originator) itself responsible for 
 saving its internal state to a (memento) object and
 restoring to a previous state from a (memento) object.

Only the originator that created a memento is allowed to access it.

A client (caretaker) can request a memento from the originator (to save the internal state of the originator) and pass a memento back to the originator (to restore to a previous state).

This enables to save and restore the internal state of an originator without violating its encapsulation.

See also the UML class and sequence diagram below.

Structure

UML class and sequence diagram 

In the above UML class diagram, 
the Caretaker class refers to the Originator class 
for saving (createMemento()) and restoring (restore(memento)) originator's internal state.

The Originator class implements 

(1) createMemento() by creating and returning a Memento object that stores originator's current internal state
and 

(2) restore(memento) by restoring state from the passed in Memento object.

The UML sequence diagram
shows the run-time interactions: 

(1) Saving originator's internal state: The Caretaker object calls createMemento() on the Originator object,
which creates a Memento object, saves 
its current internal state (setState()), and returns the Memento to the Caretaker.

(2) Restoring originator's internal state: The Caretaker calls restore(memento) on the Originator object and specifies the Memento object that stores the state that should be restored. The Originator gets the state (getState()) from the Memento to set its own state.

Java example 

The following Java program illustrates the "undo" usage of the memento pattern.

import java.util.List;
import java.util.ArrayList;
class Originator {
    private String state;
    // The class could also contain additional data that is not part of the
    // state saved in the memento..
 
    public void set(String state) {
        this.state = state;
        System.out.println("Originator: Setting state to " + state);
    }
 
    public Memento saveToMemento() {
        System.out.println("Originator: Saving to Memento.");
        return new Memento(this.state);
    }
 
    public void restoreFromMemento(Memento memento) {
        this.state = memento.getSavedState();
        System.out.println("Originator: State after restoring from Memento: " + state);
    }
 
    public static class Memento {
        private final String state;

        public Memento(String stateToSave) {
            state = stateToSave;
        }
 
        // accessible by outer class only
        private String getSavedState() {
            return state;
        }
    }
}
 
class Caretaker {
    public static void main(String[] args) {
        List<Originator.Memento> savedStates = new ArrayList<Originator.Memento>();
 
        Originator originator = new Originator();
        originator.set("State1");
        originator.set("State2");
        savedStates.add(originator.saveToMemento());
        originator.set("State3");
        // We can request multiple mementos, and choose which one to roll back to.
        savedStates.add(originator.saveToMemento());
        originator.set("State4");
 
        originator.restoreFromMemento(savedStates.get(1));   
    }
}

The output is:
 Originator: Setting state to State1
 Originator: Setting state to State2
 Originator: Saving to Memento.
 Originator: Setting state to State3
 Originator: Saving to Memento.
 Originator: Setting state to State4
 Originator: State after restoring from Memento: State3

This example uses a String as the state, which is an immutable object in Java. In real-life scenarios the state will
almost always be a mutable object, in which case a copy of the state must be made.

It must be said that the implementation shown has a drawback: it declares an internal class. It would be better if this memento strategy could apply to more than one originator.

There are mainly three other ways to achieve Memento:
 Serialization.
 A class declared in the same package.
 The object can also be accessed via a proxy, which can achieve any save/restore operation on the object.

C# example 
The memento pattern allows one to capture the internal state of an object without violating encapsulation such that later one can undo/revert the changes if required. Here one can see that the memento object is actually used to revert the changes made in the object.
class Memento
{
    private readonly string savedState;

    private Memento(string stateToSave)
    {
        savedState = stateToSave;
    }

    public class Originator
    {
        private string state;
        // The class could also contain additional data that is not part of the
        // state saved in the memento.

        public void Set(string state)
        {
            Console.WriteLine("Originator: Setting state to " + state);
            this.state = state;
        }

        public Memento SaveToMemento()
        {
            Console.WriteLine("Originator: Saving to Memento.");
            return new Memento(state);
        }

        public void RestoreFromMemento(Memento memento)
        {
            state = memento.savedState;
            Console.WriteLine("Originator: State after restoring from Memento: " + state);
        }
    }
}

class Caretaker
{
    static void Main(string[] args)
    {
        var savedStates = new List<Memento>();

        var originator = new Memento.Originator();
        originator.Set("State1");
        originator.Set("State2");
        savedStates.Add(originator.SaveToMemento());
        originator.Set("State3");
        // We can request multiple mementos, and choose which one to roll back to.
        savedStates.Add(originator.SaveToMemento());
        originator.Set("State4");

        originator.RestoreFromMemento(savedStates[1]);
    }
}

Python example
"""
Memento pattern example.
"""

class Memento:
    def __init__(self, state) -> None:
        self._state = state

    def get_saved_state(self):
        return self._state

class Originator:
    _state = ""

    def set(self, state) -> None:
        print("Originator: Setting state to", state)
        self._state = state

    def save_to_memento(self) -> Memento:
        print("Originator: Saving to Memento.")
        return Memento(self._state)

    def restore_from_memento(self, memento) -> None:
        self._state = memento.get_saved_state()
        print("Originator: State after restoring from Memento:", self._state)

saved_states = []
originator = Originator()
originator.set("State1")
originator.set("State2")
saved_states.append(originator.save_to_memento())

originator.set("State3")
saved_states.append(originator.save_to_memento())

originator.set("State4")

originator.restore_from_memento(saved_states[1])

Javascript example 
// The Memento pattern is used to save and restore the state of an object.
// A memento is a snapshot of an object's state.
var Memento = {// Namespace: Memento
    savedState : null, // The saved state of the object.

    save : function(state) { // Save the state of an object.
        this.savedState = state;
    },

    restore : function() { // Restore the state of an object.
        return this.savedState;
    }
};

// The Originator is the object that creates the memento.
// defines a method for saving the state inside a memento.
var Originator = {// Namespace: Originator
        state : null, // The state to be stored

        // Creates a new originator with an initial state of null
        createMemento : function() { 
            return {
                state : this.state // The state is copied to the memento.
            };
        },
        setMemento : function(memento) { // Sets the state of the originator from a memento
            this.state = memento.state;
        }
    };

// The Caretaker stores mementos of the objects and
// provides operations to retrieve them.
var Caretaker = {// Namespace: Caretaker
        mementos : [], // The mementos of the objects.
        addMemento : function(memento) { // Add a memento to the collection.
            this.mementos.push(memento);
        },
        getMemento : function(index) { // Get a memento from the collection.
            return this.mementos[index];
        }
    };

var action_step = "Foo"; // The action to be executed/the object state to be stored.
var action_step_2 = "Bar"; // The action to be executed/the object state to be stored.

// set the initial state
Originator.state = action_step;
Caretaker.addMemento(Originator.createMemento());// save the state to the history
console.log("Initial State: " + Originator.state); // Foo

// change the state
Originator.state = action_step_2;
Caretaker.addMemento(Originator.createMemento()); // save the state to the history
console.log("State After Change: " + Originator.state); // Bar

// restore the first state - undo
Originator.setMemento(Caretaker.getMemento(0));
console.log("State After Undo: " + Originator.state); // Foo

// restore the second state - redo
Originator.setMemento(Caretaker.getMemento(1));
console.log("State After Redo: " + Originator.state); // Bar

References

External links
Description of Memento Pattern in Ada
 Memento UML Class Diagram with C# and .NET code samples
 SourceMaking Tutorial
 Memento Design Pattern using Java

Software design patterns
Articles with example Java code
Articles with example C Sharp code
Articles with example Python (programming language) code